Black Pearls is a studio album by American jazz musician John Coltrane, released in 1964 on Prestige Records. It was recorded at a single recording session at the studio of Rudy Van Gelder in Hackensack, New Jersey.

On that Friday session, "the songs weren't long enough for a whole album", recalled producer Bob Weinstock in 2001, "so I said 'Let's do a slow blues to finish it out'." Coltrane invited Weinstock to write the song on the spot, but he didn't know music, so Coltrane replied "'Just tell me what you want me to play. Should it go like this?' and he would play some notes. After having played a rough melody, he'd say 'Okay, you wrote it.' That was the genesis of 'Sweet Sapphire Blues'".

The title track is a sustained exhibition of Coltrane's sheets of sound technique during his solo.

Track listing

Side one
 "Black Pearls" (Coltrane) – 13:13
 "Lover, Come Back to Me" (Oscar Hammerstein II, Sigmund Romberg)  7:27

Side two
 "Sweet Sapphire Blues" (Bob Weinstock) – 18:13

Personnel
 John Coltrane – tenor saxophone
 Donald Byrd – trumpet
 Red Garland – piano
 Paul Chambers – bass 
 Art Taylor – drums

References

1964 albums
John Coltrane albums
Prestige Records albums
Albums produced by Bob Weinstock